Massachusetts House of Representatives' 4th Norfolk district in the United States is one of 160 legislative districts included in the lower house of the Massachusetts General Court. It covers parts of Norfolk County and Plymouth County. Democrat James Murphy of Weymouth has represented the district since 2001. Candidates for this district seat in the 2020 Massachusetts general election are Paul Rotondo and incumbent James Murphy.

Towns represented
The district includes the following localities:
 part of Hingham
 part of Weymouth

The current district geographic boundary overlaps with that of the Massachusetts Senate's Plymouth and Norfolk district.

Former locales
The district previously covered:
 part of Quincy, circa 1927 
 part of Roxbury, circa 1872

Representatives
 James Guild, circa 1858 
 Samuel Walker, circa 1858 
 Henry Willis, circa 1858 
 Charles W. Bryant, circa 1859 
 Robert C. Nichols, circa 1859 
 Roland Worthington, 1859 
 Albert A. Brackett, circa 1888 
 Talbot Aldrich, circa 1920 
 Josiah Babcock, circa 1951 
 Roy C. Smith, circa 1951 
 Robert B. Ambler, 1965-1991 
 William D. Delahunt, circa 1975 
 James M. Murphy, 2001-current

See also
 List of Massachusetts House of Representatives elections
 Other Norfolk County districts of the Massachusetts House of Representatives: 1st, 2nd, 3rd, 5th, 6th, 7th, 8th, 9th, 10th, 11th, 12th, 13th, 14th, 15th
 List of Massachusetts General Courts
 List of former districts of the Massachusetts House of Representatives

Images
Portraits of legislators

References

External links
 Ballotpedia
  (State House district information based on U.S. Census Bureau's American Community Survey).
 League of Women Voters of Hingham

House
Government of Norfolk County, Massachusetts
Government of Plymouth County, Massachusetts